Ernolytis chlorospora is a species of sedge moth, and the only species in the genus Ernolytis. It was described by Edward Meyrick in 1922. It is found in Fiji.

References

Moths described in 1922
Glyphipterigidae